Sergiy Stakhovsky is the defending champion.

Seeds

Draw

Finals

Top half

Bottom half

References
 Main Draw
 Qualifying Draw

Singles
2015 ATP Challenger Tour